Monica Seles defeated Martina Navratilova in the final, 7–6(7–1), 6–1, to win the women's singles tennis title at the 1991 US Open. It was her third major of the year. With the win, Seles recaptured the world No. 1 ranking from Steffi Graf, and would hold it until her 1993 stabbing.

Gabriela Sabatini was the defending champion, but lost in the quarterfinals to Jennifer Capriati.

This marked the first major in which future champion and world No. 1 Lindsay Davenport competed in the main draw; she lost in the first round to Debbie Graham.

Seeds

Qualifying

Draw

Finals

Top half

Section 1

Section 2

Section 3

Section 4

Bottom half

Section 5

Section 6

Section 7

Section 8

References

External links
1991 US Open – Women's draws and results at the International Tennis Federation

Women's Singles
US Open (tennis) by year – Women's singles
1991 in women's tennis
1991 in American women's sports